NH 1A may refer to:

 National Highway 1A (India)
 New Hampshire Route 1A, United States